The Inkwell is the first mixtape by singer-songwriter-producer-rapper Sean Garrett, hosted by DJ Green Lantern. It was released on August 24, 2010 as a free download. The mixtape features Soulja Boy, Roscoe Dash, Drake, Tyga, Gucci Mane, Nicki Minaj, Lil Wayne, Bun B, and Yo Gotti.

Track listing

References

2010 mixtape albums